Travis Smyth (born 29 December 1994) is an Australian professional golfer. He won the 2017 Northern Territory PGA Championship.

Career 
Smyth enjoyed a strong amateur career representing Australia on several occasions. He won the 2015 Riversdale Cup and was runner-up at the 2016 Australian Amateur.  

Still an amateur, Smyth was runner-up at the 2016 Western Australian Open two strokes behind Curtis Luck, and won his first professional event during the 2017 PGA Tour of Australasia season, the Northern Territory PGA Championship.

Smyth turned professional in late 2017 and joined the Asian Tour after tying for 3rd at the 2018 Asian Tour Qualifying School. He finishing in the top-50 on the Order of Merit in 2018 and 2019.

On the PGA Tour of Australasia, Smyth lost a playoff at the 2019 New South Wales Open and tied for 3rd at the 2020 ISPS Handa Vic Open, a European Tour co-sanctioned event.

Smyth recorded his best Asian Tour finish at the inaugural International Series England in June 2022, where he was second, one stroke behind Scott Vincent to collect , the biggest check of his career.

Amateur wins
2014 Queensland Stroke Play & Amateur Championship
2015 Riversdale Cup
2017 NSW Amateur

Source:

Professional wins (2)

Asian Tour wins (1)

PGA Tour of Australasia wins (1)

PGA Tour of Australasia playoff record (0–1)

Team appearances
Amateur
Australian Men's Interstate Teams Matches (representing New South Wales): 2014, 2015, 2016 (winners), 2017

Source:

References

External links

Australian male golfers
PGA Tour of Australasia golfers
Asian Tour golfers
LIV Golf players
People from the Illawarra
1994 births
Living people